The Nihongo Kentei (日本語検定, The Japanese Language Examination) is a standardized test of Japanese language proficiency for native Japanese language speakers. The test is held twice a year, in June and November; approximately 300,000 people sit the examination every year.

In 2011, the test was sponsored by the Japanese Ministry of Education, Culture, Sports, Science, and Technology (MEXT).

Overview 
The Nihongo Kentei was created to assess overall ability in the Japanese language. The questions focus on more obscure and difficult areas of the Japanese language, such as proficiency in Kanji, the use of honorifics, and extended vocabulary. Although intended for native speakers, the exam is open to all applicants.

It is not to be confused with the Japanese Language Proficiency Test (JLPT), which is intended for non-native Japanese speakers.

Features 
Questions in the Nihongo Kentei fall into six categories.

敬語 (Honorifics)
 文法 (Grammar)
 語彙 (Vocabulary)
 言葉の意味 (Definitions)
 表記 (Expressions)
漢字 (Kanji)

The test consists of practical Japanese questions, designed to evaluate the candidate's understanding of Japanese. These highlight areas of strength and weaknesses.

Criteria for certification
There are two types of certifications for each level, depending on the percentage scored.

Successful applicants must score more than 50% for all the six categories mentioned above (shown in the table below as "category threshold"). If results in any category fall below the category threshold, the candidate will not be certified (except for the lowest category, Level 7). Note that 1級 (Level 1) refers to the best possible grade, and 7級(Level 7) refers to the worst.

Applications statistics and results

Non-native Japanese language speakers who passed Nihongo Kentei level 1

Based on the publicly available information, as of November 2021, there has been 1 non-native Japanese speaker who passed the Nihongo Kentei level 1 test - Evgeny Uskov (from Russian Federation).

See also 

 Japanese-Language Proficiency Test
 Business Japanese Proficiency Test
 Mandarin Proficiency Test (HSK)
 ILR scale
 J-Test
 Kanji Kentei
 Test of Proficiency in Korean
 List of language proficiency tests

References

External links 
 日本語検定(in Japanese) - the official Nihongo Kentei website

Japanese language tests
Testing and exams in Japan
Kanji